Rama Kulasekhara (fl. late 11th century CE) was the last ruler of the Chera Perumal dynasty of medieval Kerala. He was a contemporary to Chola kings Kulottunga I (1070–1120) and Vikrama Chola (1118–35 AD). Rama Kulaskehara is best known for briefly recovering Kollam-Trivandrum-Nagercoil region from the powerful Chola empire around 1100/02 AD.

Inscriptions related to Rama Kulasekhara can be found at Panthalayani Kollam near Quilandy, Thiruvaloor (on Periyar), Perunna near Changanassery, Nedumpuram Thali (Wadakkanchery) and at Kollam. Weakened authority of the Chera Perumal is evident in some of the inscriptions of Rama Kulasekhara. In 1099 AD, the leader of the Nair warriors of Nedumpurayur Nadu is seen handling the affairs of the Nedumpuram Thali, a state-sponsored temple. In 1102 AD, Rama Kulasekhara publicly atoned for the wrongs committed by him against the Brahmin community. An inscription dated to 1122 AD, found at Thiruvalanchuzhi, Tanjore (dated in the regnal year of king Vikrama Chola), also remembers Rama Kulasekhara. 

Kollam functioned as the second headquarters of the Chera Perumal kingdom towards the final phase of Rama Kulasekhara's rule (c. 1100/02 AD - c. 1122/23). According to scholars, "the strategic advantage of marriage relations with the old ruling clan of Kollam in securing the loyalty of Venad can also be considered in the light of continuous Chola-Pandya attacks in south Kerala". There is a tradition that Vira Kerala, a ruler of Kollam in early 12th century, was a son of the last Chera king.

Career 
Corrections by M. G. S. Narayanan (1972) on K. A. Nilakanta Sastri (1955, revised) point out that Chola ruler Kulottunga I oversaw only one expedition to the Chera Perumal kingdom (in c. 1097). Sastri had assumed that Kulottunga led two military thrusts to south Kerala in c. 1077-1081 and in c. 1097. 

Rama Kulasekhara came to the Chera Perumal throne in c. 1089/90. Rama was the personal name and "Kulasekhara" was the coronation title. The first record of the king - as "Kulasekhara - Koyil Adhikarikal" -  is found in the courtyard of the Panthalayani Kollam Bhagavathi temple in northern Kerala. Another inscription of "Kulasekhara Perumal" (1092 AD) can be found at the Thiruvaloor temple in the Periyar valley. Port Vizhinjam in the Ay country was called "Rajendra Chola Pattinam" by Kulottunga I Chola in 1091 AD.

Kulottunga Chola's south Kerala campaign 
Southern parts of Kerala (Venad and the Ay country), as far north as Kollam, again came under the Chola rule by 1097 AD. This military thrust was probably conducted by "Chola-Pandya" ruler Jatavarman Srivallabha or Chola general Naralokavira Kalinga Rayan for the Chola king Kulottunga I (1070–1120). Records of this campaign mention, among other things, the "chaver" warriors in Kuda Malai Nadu (meaning Kerala here) ascending the "unique heaven" in battles, "the subduing of the numerous forces of the Keralas", "making the rebel vassal kings obedient", "victory over the bow emblem" and "the Chera king's retreat from the battle field". A new era called "Kollam Azhintha Andu"  was inaugurated by the Pandyas in 1097 AD. Weakened authority of the Chera Perumal is evident in some of the inscriptions from this period. In 1099 AD, the leader of the Nair warriors of Nedumpurayur Nadu is seen handling the affairs of the Nedumpuram Thali, an originally state-sponsored temple. Earlier in 1099, Rama Kulasekhara, with the Four Brahmin Ministers (the Nalu Thali) and the Thrikkunnappuzha, is seen residing and issuing orders from the Great Temple (the Nediya Thali) at Kodungallur.

Recovery of Kollam 
It seems that the Chera Perumal managed to recover Kollam c. 1100/02 AD. A possible major battle at Poonthura, near Vizhinjam, involving Mana Vikrama of Eranadu and his Nairs later known as "Poonthura Nairs", was instrumental in this recovery. Cholas eventually fixed their boundary at Kottar (leaving the Venad and the Ay country to the Cheras). We have a mention of a council attended by king Rama Kulasekhara and Mana Vikrama Punthurakkon (the future Zamorin, "the first among the samanthas") at Kollam in 1102 AD. Rama Kulasekhara publicly atoned for the wrongs committed by him against the Brahmins at this council. The record was probably made in the aftermath of the recovery of Kollam.

Vikrama Chola's south Kerala campaign 
Later years of Rama Kulasekhara witnessed Vikrama Chola's south Kerala campaign (c. 1102–c. 1118 AD) against the Chera Perumals. This expedition was probably conducted by the Pandya Jatavarman Parakrama. Records mention the defeat of the Chera in a "single campaign" in Malai Nadu, the levying of tribute from the Chera king, and the capture of Venad and the Ay country by the Chola-Pandyas. The "Kupaka" (meaning Venad here) ruler also seems to have offered his daughter in marriage to Parakrama Pandya (Parakrama also visited the Anantapuram Temple during this period).

A Tanjore inscription of Vikrama Chola mentions "the flight of the Chera king". Rama Kulasekhara is also remembered in a Thiruvalanjuli inscription (1122 AD) of certain Kizhan Adikal. By 1121, an unnamed Kupaka ruler had defeated Pandya king Rajasimha and conquered up to Nanjinadu and Kottar. Vira Kerala, the independent ruler of Venad (possibly the son of Rama Kulasekhara), finds mention in a Cholapuram temple inscription dated to 1126 AD.

Epigraphic records 
Note: Material: granite, script: Vattezhuthu with Grantha, and language: old Malayalam (unless otherwise stated)

Quilon Inscription of Kollam 278 
 Sources: Travancore Archaeological Series (Volume V) & 'Index to Cera Inscriptions' (1972)

Literary evidences 
A medieval Malayalam sloka names the last "Cheraman" as "Rama Varma".

Patron of Vasubhatta 
Vasubhatta, a famous Yamaka poet of medieval Kerala, names his patron king as "Rama". A later commentary on a poem by Vasubhatta says that "Kulasekhara" was the regnal title of king Rama. Scholars generally consider this a result of confusion on the part of the commentators (between Sthanu Ravi Kulasekhara and Rama Rajasekhara) who were separated in time from Vasubhatta. Some scholars identify king Rama Kulasekhara as the patron of poet Vasubhatta (and with royal dramatist Kulasekhara Varma). This view is generally found unacceptable on several counts.

See also 
 Chera dynasty
 Kulothunga Chola I

References

Rulers of Quilon
People of the Kodungallur Chera kingdom
11th-century Indian monarchs
12th-century Indian monarchs
Tamil history
Kodungallur Chera kings